TV Familia is a Caracas based regional familiar, entertainment, religious (Roman Catholic) and cultural television network.  It can be seen by those only living in greater Caracas on UHF channel 69.  It can also be seen on Directv channel 117, Net Uno (8),  Intercable (79) in Caracas, Guarenas, Guatire, and the Vargas State, and Sistemcable (4).

See also
List of Venezuelan television channels

External links
Official Site 

Television networks in Venezuela
Television stations in Venezuela
Mass media in Caracas
Mass media in Venezuela
Television channels and stations established in 2000
2000 establishments in Venezuela
Television in Venezuela
Spanish-language television stations